Matti Helge Ranin (21 November 1926 – 24 November 2013) was a Finnish actor.

Ranin had an extensive career in film. He was in his prime as film-actor in the 1950s and 60s, most famously playing Captain Kariluoto in an Edvin Laine film The Unknown Soldier. He also had a recurring role of Toivo Virta in the Inspector Palmu films and appeared as Lauri Salpakari in Here, Beneath the North Star, the 1968 film adaption of Väinö Linna's novel trilogy Under the North Star.

Ranin has also acted extensively as a voice-over artist in children's audio books, cartoons and TV shows. He became known as the voice of the horse Histamiini, performed in puppet theatre style programming and based on the children's books by Raili Mikkanen. Ranin also directed various Finnish versions of animated films from 1981 to 1992, including The Little Mermaid in 1990 and Beauty and The Beast in 1992. Ranin was also a voice actor in various animated films and series, including Doc in Snow White and The Seven Dwarfs and Maurice in Beauty and The Beast. Ranin also had long running television roles as Pentti Karvala in the hospital drama Ihmeiden tekijät and as Kaarlo Kares on the soap opera Kotikatu.

Selected filmography

In films
Loviisa – Niskavuoren nuori emäntä (1946)
Ruma Elsa (1949)
Kanavan laidalla (1949)
Hilman päivät (1954)
The Unknown Soldier (1955)
Inspector Palmu's Mistake (1960)
Here, Beneath the North Star (1968)
Akseli and Elina (1970)
Tie naisen sydämeen (1996)

On television
Joulukalenteri (1980, 1985)
Mustapartainen mies (1990)
Blondi tuli taloon (1994–1995)
Ihmeiden tekijät (1996–1998)
Parhaat vuodet (2000–2002)
Kotikatu (2004–2009)
Taivaan tulet (2011)

References

External links

1926 births
2013 deaths
male actors from Tampere
Finnish male actors